Can I Keep This Pen? is the third album from New York-based rap trio Northern State. The album saw a slight departure in song styling, with some obvious pop/indie influences, and as many pop songs as traditional rap songs.

Track listing

References

2007 albums
Ipecac Recordings albums
Northern State (band) albums